Hitch Hike to Heaven (alternative title Footlights and Shadows) is a 1936 American drama film directed by Frank R. Strayer and starring Henrietta Crosman, Herbert Rawlinson and Russell Gleason. An actor becomes arrogant after enjoying success in Hollywood and neglects his wife and son.

Cast

References

Bibliography
 Michael R. Pitts. Poverty Row Studios, 1929-1940: An Illustrated History of 55 Independent Film Companies, with a Filmography for Each. McFarland & Company, 2005.

External links

Hitch Hike to Heaven at TV Guide (a slightly different version of this 1987 write-up was originally published in The Motion Picture Guide)
Hitch Hike to Heaven at British Film Institute

1936 films
1936 drama films
American drama films
American black-and-white films
Films directed by Frank R. Strayer
Chesterfield Pictures films
1930s English-language films
1930s American films